Melville Gould (born 19 July 1930 in Toronto, Ontario) is a Canadian former yacht racer who competed in the 1960 Summer Olympics.

References

1930 births
Living people
Sportspeople from Toronto
Canadian male sailors (sport)
Olympic sailors of Canada
Sailors at the 1960 Summer Olympics – 5.5 Metre